The Lake Cities was a passenger train operated by the Erie Railroad and successor Erie Lackawanna Railway between Chicago and New Jersey termini — first, Jersey City and later Hoboken.

The Lake Cities began in 1939 as the Midlander, a Jersey City-Chicago service with sections to Cleveland, Ohio, and Buffalo, New York. From its eastern terminus, the Erie's Pavonia Terminal in Jersey City, the route ran through Port Jervis to Binghamton over the traditional Erie main line through Sullivan and Orange County in New York's Southern Tier and on to Chicago. Unlike other New York-Chicago trains, it bypassed Buffalo to the south, running through Jamestown, Youngstown, Akron and Marion.

A few years before the Erie's 1960 merger with the Delaware, Lackawanna and Western Railroad, the Lake Cities began running into the Hoboken Terminal in Hoboken, New Jersey.  Upon the merger, it was routed over the Lackwanna's Poconos main line route in northern New Jersey and northeastern Pennsylvania. Between 1961 and 1962, the train was known as the "Chicago Lake Cities/Buffalo Lake Cities", but reverted to Lake Cities. Sleeper service ended on October 28, 1962. From April 26 until October 25, 1964, the Lake Cities was renamed The World's Fair in connection with the 1964 World's Fair in New York. After the conclusion of the fair in 1965, the Lake Cities name was restored to the train. On November 28, 1966, the Lake Cities regained diner and sleeper service to compensate for the withdrawal of the Phoebe Snow (which had its final run the previous day), but by 1967 the sleeping service went no further west than Marion, Ohio, while the dining car stopped at Huntington, Indiana.

The Erie Lackawanna withdrew the train on January 6, 1970.

Equipment 
After World War II the Erie acquired seven lightweight sleepers from Pullman-Standard, each with ten roomettes and six double bedrooms. The Lake Cities carried one in each direction between New York and Chicago.

Station stops 
This late 1960s timetable with the New Jersey and Pennsylvania stops reflects a consolidation of service with the Phoebe Snow train, which was discontinued in 1966.

Before the 1960 Erie-Lackawanna merger, the Lake Cities' route ran through New York's Sullivan and Orange Counties.

References 

Passenger rail transportation in Illinois
Passenger rail transportation in Indiana
Passenger rail transportation in New Jersey
Passenger rail transportation in New York (state)
Passenger rail transportation in Ohio
Passenger rail transportation in Pennsylvania
Passenger trains of the Erie Lackawanna Railway
Passenger trains of the Erie Railroad
Night trains of the United States
Named passenger trains of the United States
Railway services introduced in 1939
Railway services discontinued in 1970